The 1980 Supertaça de Portugal was the 2nd edition of the Supertaça de Portugal, the annual Portuguese football season-opening match contested by the winners of the previous season's top league and cup competitions (or cup runner-up in case the league- and cup-winning club is the same). The 1980 Supertaça de Portugal was contested over two legs, and opposed Benfica and Sporting CP of the Primeira Liga. Sporting CP qualified for the SuperCup by winning the 1979–80 Primeira Divisão, whilst Benfica qualified for the Supertaça by winning the 1979–80 Taça de Portugal.

The first leg which took place at the Estádio José Alvalade, saw 2–2 draw. The second leg which took place at the Estádio da Luz, saw the Águias defeat the Leões 2–1 (4–3 on aggregate) to claim a first Supertaça.

First leg

Details

Second leg

Details

References

Supertaça Cândido de Oliveira 1980
Super
Sporting CP matches
S.L. Benfica matches